Cyphostemma cirrhosum is a species of plant native to southern Africa. It is a soft-stemmed creeper with succulent, yellowish-green leaves. It bears yellow flowers and red, oval-shaped fruit.

References

 
 

cirrhosum